West Bridgford Rugby Football Club is a rugby union club in West Bridgford, England whose first team plays in the Midlands 1 East following their promotion as champions of Midlands 2 East (North) at the end of the 2017-18 season.

History 
West Bridgford Rugby Football Club began life at its present home on Stamford Road, West Bridgford in 1945. The club stands in memory of those West Bridgfordiands that gave their lives in both World Wars and Stamford Road will forever be a memorial ground.

The Rugby section actually forms one half of the West Bridgford Sports Club, with a thriving cricket section as a sister arm (West Bridgfordians Cricket Club).

Historically, West Bridgford RFC have run between two and three senior sides adding a veterans team on most weeks and the club is now flourishing.

Achievements 
The first team squad achieved back to back promotions in the 2002–2004 seasons and are currently (2006–2007 season) in line to be promoted again in what has been a successful decade.

Current playing base 
There are over 150 senior players registered to the club, with over 30 training twice weekly. The club also has a successful junior section of over 150 registered youngsters, ranging in age from 6 to 19. The top junior age category, The Colts (aged 17–19) are current area champions at their age group and in the 2014-15 season won the NLD Championships to become East Midland Champions.

The National Lottery 
In 2004, West Bridgford RFC secured funding of £170,000 from the National Lottery Charitable Funds commission to enable the build of a state of the art changing facility. Other funding was kindly provided by Rushcliffe Borough Council, WREN and The RFU amongst others. The club raised over £30,000 independently of these funds. This follows a £50,000 redevelopment of the First Team pitch and plans for a £50,000 internal project to rejuvenate the bar facility. The Clubhouse has now been fully renovated - http://www.pitchero.com/clubs/westbridgford/

Playing links 
There is an exchange scheme from St Edmunds School in Canberra, Australia for a number of their students to travel over to Nottingham and play for the club for 12 months. There are also links with both South African and New Zealand rugby entities.

Honours 
Midlands 2 East (North) champions: 2017-18

References

External links
 Official website

English rugby union teams
1945 establishments in England
Rugby clubs established in 1945
Rugby union in Nottinghamshire
West Bridgford